Michael Nolan may refer to:

Michael Nolan (MP) (died 1827), Irish barrister, judge, politician and legal author
Michael Nolan, Baron Nolan (1928–2007), British retired judge
Michael N. Nolan (1833–1905), American politician
Michael J. Nolan, American printer and politician from New York
Michael Nolan (psychologist), Irish Catholic priest and psychologist
Mick Nolan, Gaelic football player
Mick Nolan (footballer) (1949–2008), Australian rules footballer for North Melbourne
Mike Nolan (born 1959), American football coach with the San Francisco 49ers
Mike Nolan (singer) (born 1954), Irish-born English vocalist with Bucks Fizz
Mike Nolan, character in A Soul's Awakening
Mike Nolan, character in The Big Lez Show